Wellington Amateurs Football Club is an English football club from Wellington, Shropshire but currently located in Telford. After many years in the Wellington League, the team was promoted to the Shropshire County Football League. They were promoted to the West Midlands (Regional) League in 2006. "The Ams" won Division One three times in four seasons and gained promotion to the Premier Division for 2012–13.

History
The club was formed in 1950 as Old Wellingtonians by former students of Wellington Grammar School. The name was later changed to the current one when Head Master of the school discovered that the club had started accepting players that were not former pupils. After 31 years in the Wellington League, the club joined the Shropshire County Football League Division One in 1981. In their inaugural season, Wellington won the league and cup double, gaining promotion to the Premier Division. They won the Premier Division in 1982–83 and 1988–89, and finished runners-up in 2005–06, allowing them to apply for membership of the West Midlands (Regional) League Division Two. Wellington won the league in their first season and gained promotion to Division One. Despite winning the league in 2008–09 and 2009–10, they were not promoted due to their ground not being up to standard. After ground improvements, and winning the league in 2011–12, Wellington were promoted to the Premier Division. The club captured their first bit of silverware in a decade when they defeated Shrewsbury Juniors at the New Bucks Head on Tuesday 10th May 2022, winning the game 1-0 thanks to a Charlie Knowles goal. With this they lifted the Shropshire Challenge cup. Days after Tom White stepped down and Development manager Matthew Boswell took the first team managers role.

Colours
Wellington Amateurs' colours are red shirts, red shorts and red socks. The away colours are Yellow shirt, yellow shorts and yellow socks

Grounds

The club plays its home matches at School Grove in Oakengates, Telford.

Honours

League honours

West Midlands (Regional) League Division One
Champions 2008–09, 2009–10, 2011–12
Runners-up 2010–11
West Midlands (Regional) League Division Two
Champions 2007–08
Shropshire County Football League Premier Division
Champions 1982–83, 1988–89
Shropshire County Football League Division One
Champions 1981–82
Wellington League Division Two
1954–55, 1960–61
Wellington League Division Three
1961–62

Cup honours

West Midlands (Regional) League Division One Cup
Winners 2010–11
Shropshire County Football League Premier Division Cup
Winners 1998–99
WJ Evans Cup
Winners 1986–87
Shrewsbury Town Directors Cup
Winners 1991–92
Commander Ethelstone Cup
Winners 1990–91, 2003–04
Wellington Senior Cup
Winners 1969–70, 1970–71
Shropshire Challenge Cup
Winners 2021-22

Records
FA Vase
First Round 2018–19
Highest league position: 12th in West Midlands (Regional) League Premier Division, 2012–13

See also
Football in Shropshire

References

External links

Football clubs in England
West Midlands (Regional) League
Association football clubs established in 1950
Football clubs in Shropshire
1950 establishments in England